The 2013 USASA Region I National Cup will be a qualifying tournament to determine which clubs from the first region of the United States Adult Soccer Association will qualify for the first round proper of the 2013 U.S. Open Cup.

Two teams from Region I will qualify for the U.S. Open Cup in May.  The winner will then qualify for the National Finals.

Qualification

Bracket 

≈ NY originally won 1-0 but there was an issue at the league level that caused the decision to replay the game.
° The Screaming Eagles were disqualified due to fielding ineligible players. The Aegean Hawks were advanced in their place.

Matches

See also 
 2013 U.S. Open Cup
 2013 U.S. Open Cup qualification
 United States Adult Soccer Association

References 

USASA Region I National Cup
2013